, also , was a Noh actor of late Edo and early Meiji period Japan. A prolific teacher of Noh in the Meiji period, he taught a variety of people including the painter Kōgyo, the writer Ezra Pound, and the scholar and art collector Ernest Fenollosa. His diary, published under the title Umewaka Minoru Nikki, spans much of his life, and records in great detail his activities and the world of Noh in the Meiji period.

References
Umewaka Minoru (2003). Umewaka Minoru Nikki. Tokyo: Yagi Shoten.
Toyotaka Komiya (1956). Japanese music and drama in the Meiji era. Tokyo: Ōbunsha.
Ernest Fenollosa and Ezra Pound (1916). "Noh", or, Accomplishment: a study of the classical stage of Japan. London: Macmillan.

1828 births
1909 deaths
People of Meiji-period Japan
Japanese diarists
Japanese male actors
Noh
19th-century diarists